Feadóga Stáin ("Of the Tin Whistle"), Mary Bergin's debut album, has been credited with establishing the tin whistle as one of the first tier among the standard instruments of Irish Traditional Music.  Members of Irish group De Dannan contributed accompaniment and the album is mostly a trio of tin whistle, Irish bouzouki and Bodhrán (Irish frame drum) .  This album has been cited by Joanie Madden as highly influential in the development of her own playing, and is generally considered by critics and scholars as a "definitive" or milestone album.

Tracks

Musicians
Mary Bergin : F whistle on 3,5,7,11, Eb whistle on 1,4,8,10,12, D whistle on 6, C whistle on 13, Bb whistle on 2,9, low G whistle on 14
Alec Finn : bouzouki, mandocello
Johnny 'Ringo' McDonagh : bodhrán, bones

References

External links
 Celtic Instruments
 Tin Whistler
[ Allmusic]

Mary Bergin albums
1979 debut albums